The Somme is a 1927 British documentary film directed by M.A. Wetherell. It re-examined the 1916  Battle of the Somme during the First World War.

Production
The film was made at Isleworth Studios using a docudrama format. It involved a number of the personnel who had previously worked on a successful series of documentary reconstructions of First World War battles by British Instructional Films released between 1921 and 1927. British Instructional Films had finished their series with The Battles of Coronel and Falkland Islands, and Geoffrey Barkas moved to the newly established New Era films to carry on the cycle. When Barkas fell ill, Wetherell was brought in to take over the project. Although Wetherell received the directors credit, much of the film was made by Barkas and Boyd Cable.

Toronto ads touted that the Imperial Army Museum provided the footage; its actual name is the Imperial War Museum.

The following year the company released another docudrama, Q-Ships.

Release
Toronto, Ontario theatre Tivoli hosted the first Canadian showing, with hundreds of people being "turned away" from the theatre daily.

Critical reception
A "masterpiece of British pictures," a "press agent" for the film told The Toronto Daily Star. "[M]ere words fail utterly to describe even one scene of this mighty picture taken from the battlefields of France. Judging by the excitement and enthuasiasm created in its first Canadian showing, The Somme will undoubtedly duplicate its effect every time it is thrown on the screen. The Somme is more than a war picture. It deals with humanity in the war, the bitter and the sweet, the fineness and the hellishness, the friendliness and the hate. It is utterly free from hokum, but full of sentiment. It you are a red-blooded Britisher, you will not want to miss The Somme. It is something superb in motion pictures."

References

Bibliography
 Low, Rachael. History of the British Film, 1918-1929. George Allen & Unwin, 1971.
 Wood, Linda. British Films 1927-1939. British Film Institute, 1986.

External links

1927 films
British documentary films
Films directed by M. A. Wetherell
British silent feature films
Films shot at Isleworth Studios
Documentary films about the Battle of the Somme
British black-and-white films
1920s English-language films
1920s British films
Silent war films